Jean-Michel Coulon (1920-2014) was a French painter from the School of Paris who had the particularity of having kept his work – over 600 paintings – almost secret over his artistic lifetime. Exhibits took place in Paris at the Jeanne Bucher Gallery in 1949 and 1950 and in Brussels in 1971.

Being well introduced in the artistic movement of the 1940s and 50s, he was acquainted with Nicolas de Staël, Serge Poliakoff, André Lanskoy, Maria Helena Vieira da Silva, met Picasso, in particular with his brother in law Olivier Debré. He then gradually isolated himself to the point of rarely mentioning his painting.

Biography 
1920: Born in Bordeaux, France. He was the grandson of Georges Coulon, vice-president of the Conseil d'État from 1898 to 1922, and the great-grandson of Eugène Pelletan and Eugène Scribe.

Years 1930s: Studies at the Lycée Janson-de-Sailly, then at preparatory classes to the French Grandes Ecoles at the Lycée Henri-IV, Paris. He undertook numerous visits to Germany, where he quickly became fluent, to Italy after high school with his friend and future brother in law Olivier Debré, on cargo ships along the Atlantic and Mediterranean coasts of Africa, on which he managed to board without paying any fees. He was witness to the increase of fascist ideology: he sees Hitler in Berlin then Mussolini in Rome.

1940: Jean-Michel Coulon was 20 years old when war broke out. In 1943, the Vichy regime introduced the compulsory work service so he decided to leave Paris and obtained a false identity card. He went to Megève in the French Alps with Olivier Debré. It was during this period that the two friends both decided to devote themselves to painting.

1944: Jean-Michel’s brother, Jean-Rémi – 19 years old –  was shot by the Germans at the Farm du By (Loiret).

1945: He began painting steadily in Paris.

1949: He met his future wife, Caroline Garabedian, an American violinist studying at the Paris Conservatory. He quickly learned English. He exhibited at the Jeanne Bucher gallery, in Paris with: Georges Braque, Pablo Picasso, Paul Klee, Jean Lurçat, Jean-Paul Laurens, Nicolas de Staël, André Lanskoy, Maria Helena Vieira da Silva, Hans Reichel, André Bauchant, Alfred Manessier, Árpád Szenes and Vassily Kandinsky.

1950: He exhibited alone at the Galerie Jeanne Bucher. The guest book shows signatures of many famous people. He takes part in a group exhibit in New York, at the Sidney Janis gallery. He spent three months at the Maison Descartes, in Amsterdam, having won a scholarship from the French Government. He became familiar with the Dutch classic painters and of course learned Dutch.

1952: His other younger brother, Jean-François – a 25 years old officer in the French Air Force – crashed in a plane during a mission in Tunisia.

1953: He married Caroline Garabedian.

1955: The house and studio in Saint-Jean de Braye, near Orleans burned down in a fire. A great number of paintings are lost.

1956: He stayed two-month in the US; discovers the huge cities and is fascinated by New York. This first visit was the first of a long series of trips, most likely, a great source of inspiration for his painting.

1957: Birth of his only daughter.

1968: When France got out of the integrated NATO commandment, he moved to Brussels, with his wife who worked at the American mission to NATO. They will remain there until 1998.
From Brussels, the family traveled across Europe by car in all directions, with trips to cultural and artistic sights. 
He took the car alone, sometimes, and left to explore some European countries, spending the night with local inhabitants, asking people to open very confidential illuminated archives or drawings kept out of the light.

1971: His exhibit in Brussels at the Regency gallery organized by Michel Vockaer was a big success. Eighteen paintings were sold. There was supposed to be a series of three shows. Only the first was held. Jean-Michel Coulon preferred to use the excuse of never being ready for the next series of paintings.

1999: He returns to live in Paris in the 16th arrondissement with a nearby studio. 
He did not renew close contacts with the Paris galleries. He remained discreet, almost hidden. He goes to his studio every afternoon. His work went from painting to collages, which were done on oil paintings dating from the 1950s and 1960s.

2012: His health declined and after a long hospital stay he was confined to a wheelchair. Going back and forth to the studio was no longer possible, so it remained untouched until his death. He composes collages in his apartment,
on sheets of heavy drawing paper. His spirit remaining intelligent and lively up
to the end, he was working to the very last days, still with warm and bright colors.

2014: Jean-Michel Coulon died on October 25, at the age of 94. He is buried in Saint-Georges-de-Didonne (Charente-Maritime), with the generations of Coulons.

Description of the Work 

Jean-Michel Coulon painted in the greatest secrecy until his death at the end of 2014; he did not let anyone enter his studio and he never showed his painting, even to his relatives.

Around 1,000 works were discovered the day after his death at the opening of his studio. Because he had lost the use of his legs, he had not been able to work there for several years.

Due to its recent discovery and the absence of comments left by the artist, the overall vision of the work of Jean-Michel Coulon is being considered and subject to discussion.

The main points of reflection concern in particular:
 The positioning of Jean-Michel Coulon in the art history of the 20th century and comparing him to the painters he was close to after the Second World War (Nicolas de Staël, Maria Helena Vieira da Silva, André Lanskoy and Olivier Debré, among others),
 The evolution of his style (forms, colors, material) during the 70 years of his life as an artist,
 The impact of the dramas of his life on his artistic choices, including the brutal death of his two brothers in 1944 and 1952 and the burning of his house and some of his works in 1955,
 The secret that surrounded his artistic approach,
 The opportunity to search for a key to understanding his work in letters he wrote during his travels, particularly to the United States and Italy, which have now been published with a foreword by Annie Cohen-Solal.

The art historian Lydia Harambourg proposed some answers in a first monograph of Jean-Michel Coulon published in June 2018.

The evolution of the work can be schematically illustrated as follows:

Exhibitions 
Exhibitions over Jean-Michel Coulon's lifetime:
 1949 : Group exhibition at the Jeanne Bucher Gallery in Paris
 1950 : Exhibition at the Jeanne Bucher Gallery in Paris
 1950 : Group exhibition called "Young Painters from the US and France" at the Sidney Janis Gallery in New York, with Nicolas de Staël, Mark Rothko, André Lanskoy, Pierre Soulages, Jean Dubuffet, Jackson Pollock among others. 
 1971 : Exhibition at the Régence Gallery in Brussels

Posthumous exhibits:
 2018 : Exhibition at the Dutko Gallery in Paris, rue Bonaparte
 2019 : Exhibition at the Maison des Arts de Châtillon
 2019 : Exhibition at the Laurentin Gallery in Brussels
2019 : Group exhibition A Century of Collage at the Rosenberg & Co gallery, New York, USA
2020 : Group exhibition Couleur-Lumière at the galerie 50, La Cadière d’Azur, France
2021 : Group exhibition Summer Show at the galerie Dutko, Paris, France
2021 : Group exhibition Quatre Peintres Abstraits de l’Après-Guerre at the galerie Luz 26, Saint-Jean de Luz, France
2021 : Group exhibition Petits Formats at the galerie 50, La Cadière d’Azur, France
2021 : Group exhibition Collages des Années 50 aux Années 2000 at the galerie Luz 26, Saint-Jean de Luz, France

Gallery

References

Bibliography
 Lydia Harambourg: Jean-Michel Coulon, (Gourcuff-Gradenigo, 2018)
 Foreword by Annie Cohen-Solal, Lettres d'Amérique, (Gourcuff-Gradenigo, 2019) 
 Foreword by Annie Cohen-Solal, Lettres d'Italie, (Gourcuff-Gradenigo, 2019) 
 Paul Baquiast: Une dynastie de la bourgeoisie républicaine, les Pelletan (L'Harmattan, 1996)

External links
Jean-Michel Coulon, a Life in Painting

1920 births
2014 deaths
20th-century French painters
20th-century French male artists
French male painters
Modern painters
School of Paris
Abstract painters
Painters from Paris
French abstract artists